Dagny Hald (17 April 1936 – 6 September 2001) was a Norwegian ceramist and illustrator. She was born in Bærum, the daughter of Axel Revold. She is represented with works at the National Gallery of Norway, at the Victoria and Albert Museum in London, and other galleries. Among her books are Mellom to stoler from 1980, Sidespor from 1986 and Oppsving from 1996, all in collaboration with her husband Finn Hald and designer Roar Høyland.

References

1936 births
2001 deaths
Artists from Bærum
Norwegian ceramists
Norwegian women ceramists
20th-century ceramists